The South Africa Far East cable is an optical fiber submarine communications cable linking Melkbosstrand, South Africa to Penang, Malaysia.

It was commissioned in 2002 and built by Tyco Submarine Systems of the United States with an initial capacity of 10 Gigabits per second, and current capacity of 440 Gigabits per second. It has four fiber strands, using Erbium-doped fiber amplifier repeaters and wavelength division multiplexing.

Together with SAT-3/WASC, it also provides redundancy for other cables travelling through the Middle East.

It has landing points at:
 Melkbosstrand, near Cape Town, Western Cape, South Africa (where it meets the SAT-2 and SAT-3 cable systems)
 Mtunzini, KwaZulu-Natal, South Africa (branch)
 Saint Paul, Réunion
 Baie du Jacotet, Savanne, Mauritius
 Kochi, India (branch) (where it meets the SEA-ME-WE 3 cable system)
 Penang, Malaysia (where it meets the FLAG and SEA-ME-WE 3 cable systems)

References

External links
 Official SAT-3/WASC/SAFE Homepage
 SAFE on Greg's Cable Map

Submarine communications cables in the Indian Ocean
2002 establishments in Africa
2002 disestablishments in Asia
Submarine communications cables in the Arabian Sea
2002 establishments in Kerala